The Qoros 5 is a compact crossover SUV (sport utility vehicle) produced by the Chinese automobile manufacturer Qoros.

Overview
The Qoros 5 is the second model of automobile from the Chinese manufacturer Qoros Auto, jointly (50%–50%) owned by Kenon Holdings and China's Chery Automobile Company. 

The five-door SUV was launched at the Guangzhou Motor Show in November 2015.  Sales commenced in China early March 2016.

Specification
The 5 was launched with a four-cylinder 1.6-litre (1598 cc) turbocharged petrol engine shared with the Qoros 3 producing .

Sales
In its first year of sales, the 5 accounted for 45 percent of the company's models sold, with nearly 11,000 sold during 2016.

References

External links

Qoros vehicles
Cars of China
Front-wheel-drive vehicles
Compact sport utility vehicles
Crossover sport utility vehicles
Cars introduced in 2016